Steven A. Seifert was an American medical toxicologist. He was a professor of emergency medicine at the University of New Mexico, as well as the medical director of the New Mexico Poison and Drug Information Center. Since 2017, he was the editor-in-chief of Clinical Toxicology. He was also a jazz tenor saxophonist.

Education
Seifert received his B.S., with Honors and with Distinction, from Cornell University in 1972 and his M.D. from the University of Cincinnati in 1976. He completed his internship in family medicine at the University of Arizona, his fellowship in medical toxicology at the University of Colorado and received an advanced certificate in medical writing and editing from the University of Chicago.

Medical career
After his initial training, Seifert practiced emergency medicine from 1977 to 2001 and was certified by the American Board of Emergency Medicine, maintaining that certification for 30 years. After completing his Medical Toxicology fellowship, Seifert served on the staff of the Arizona Poison and Drug Information Center in Tucson, after which he served as the Medical Director of the Nebraska Poison Center in Omaha. In 2003, he helped to save the Nebraska Poison Center from closure, moving it into the University of Nebraska Medical Center, and became the inaugural Medical Director of the reborn Nebraska Regional Poison Center. In 2005, he developed and chaired “Snakebites in the New Millennium,” a progenitor meeting of the Venom Week Symposiums. He also chaired Venom Week III in 2009 and co-chaired the combined Venom Week IV/International Society on Toxinology meeting in 2012. In 2006, under a DHHS/HRSA Grant, he was part of the team that created the web-based Antivenom Index, a resource for zoos to document their holdings of antivenoms to non-native species and for clinicians to locate those antivenoms to treat exotic envenomations. In 2007, he became the Medical Director of the New Mexico Poison and Drug Information Center. Much of Seifert's academic work has been in the field of envenomations and antivenoms. He was an investigator in a number of clinical trials of antivenoms that resulted in FDA-licensed pharmaceuticals. He has over 200 peer-reviewed, scientific publications including a review of snake envenomations in the New England Journal of Medicine, and medical textbook chapters, including in Goldman-Cecil Medicine, Critical Care Toxicology, Conn's Current Therapy, UpToDate, and Medical Toxicology, 3e (Lippincott Williams & Wilkins) He co-edited Clinical Toxinology in Australia, Europe and Americas (Springer). He also served on the New Mexico Prescription Drug Misuse and Overdose Prevention and Pain Management Advisory Council as the statutory representative of the University of New Mexico. Seifert has served as a Guest Editor of Toxicon. He was appointed to the Senior Editorial Board of Clinical Toxicology in 2008, as an Associate Editor in 2014, and as Editor in Chief in 2017.

Honors and awards
Seifert was a Fellow of the American Academy of Clinical Toxicology, of the American College of Medical Toxicology, and of the European Association of Poisons Centres and Clinical Toxicologists. He previously was elected as a Fellow of the American College of Emergency Physicians. He has served on the Boards of Directors of the American College of Medical Toxicology, the American Association of Poison Control Centers, and the North American Society of Toxinology (NAST), including as NAST's inaugural Board President. In 1996 he received a JCPenney Golden Rule Finalist Award, an Arizona Governor's Recognition Award, and a subsequent U.S. Presidential Service Award nomination for his work with victims of sexual assault. He received the Distinguished Alumni Award from the University of Cincinnati College of Medicine in 2011, the Presidential Merit Award from the American Academy of Clinical Toxicology in 2018, the Volunteer Faculty Award of the University of New Mexico College of Pharmacy in 2019, and the Matthew J. Ellenhorn Career Achievement Award of the American College of Medical Toxicology, in 2022.

Selected peer-reviewed medical publications

Other published work
Seifert has published non-medical works of scientific research, as well as humor and fiction, including: "On Batting Order" in the Baseball Research Journal (1994; 23: 101-105), the official journal of the Society for American Baseball Research, "Sherlock Holmes: Academic Toxicologist" in the Baker Street Journal (2001; 51, no. 1: 23-27), the official journal of The Baker Street Irregulars, "The Cheap Romantic" in the Tucson Weekly (11/11/92), and "For the Birds" in Tucson Lifestyle Magazine (7/95), among others.

Other accomplishments
Seifert was a bicyclist, having ridden in bicycle races and events at distances between 25 miles to greater than 100 miles. He also held a black belt in Tae Kwon Do from the World Taekwondo Federation/U.S. Kukkiwon Association. Seifert was also a jazz, tenor saxophonist who, since 2012, had performed regularly in the "Arts-in-Medicine" concert series at the University of New Mexico Hospital and other venues with his combo, "Once Again." Both he and his combo were featured in the May, 2021 issue of "Albuquerque, The Magazine". In 2020, he became a founding member of "The Steve Seifert Project,", a virtual music group whose members are all named, "Steve Seifert" including the Nashville dulcimer player, Steve Seifert and the Los Angeles bassist, Steve Seifert.

References

American toxicologists
University of New Mexico faculty
Living people
Cornell University alumni
University of Cincinnati College of Medicine alumni
Medical journal editors
1950 births